Christopher Banks (born December 6, 1987 in Concord, New Hampshire) is an American former soccer player.

Early life

Banks grew up in Westborough, Massachusetts, where he contributed to the school's soccer team becoming state champions in 2003. He also played on Varsity Basketball.

Career

College and Amateur
Banks played his college soccer at the University of New Hampshire, where during his time there was named the America East Striker and Rookie of the Year during his Freshman year. In 2006, was named to the All-Northeast Region and to the All-New England second teams, was fourth on UNH's all-time goals list with 23, seventh on UNH's all-time points list with 46 and was selected as a member of the America East Academic Honor Roll in both 2006 & 2008.

During his college career, Banks played with USL Premier Development League club New Hampshire Phantoms during their 2009 season. After leaving college, he also played one season for GPS Portland Phoenix during their 2010 season in the USL PDL, netting 9 goals in 11 appearances.

Professional
Banks signed his first professional contract in February 2011, joining USL Pro club Wilmington Hammerheads, and made his professional debut on April 29, 2011 in a 3-2 win over the Pittsburgh Riverhounds. He scored his first two professional goals on May 14, 2011 in a 3-1 win over F.C. New York.

References

External links
 UNH profile

1987 births
Living people
American soccer players
Association football forwards
GPS Portland Phoenix players
People from Westborough, Massachusetts
Seacoast United Phantoms players
Sportspeople from Worcester County, Massachusetts
Soccer players from Massachusetts
USL Championship players
USL League Two players
Wilmington Hammerheads FC players